The Guam Department of Youth Affairs is the youth corrections agency of the United States territory of Guam. The department has its headquarters in the village of  Mangilao. The Guam Youth Correctional Facility, operated by the department, is in Mangilao. The agency also operates the Cottage Homes, located in the village Talofofo. The Liheng Famaguon School provides educational services to inmates of the department.

References

External links

 Guam Department of Youth Affairs

Government of Guam
Juvenile detention centers in the United States
State corrections departments of the United States